Lamacoscylus is a genus of longhorn beetles of the subfamily Lamiinae, containing the following species:

 Lamacoscylus bivittatus (Gahan, 1892)
 Lamacoscylus humilis (Bates, 1881)
 Lamacoscylus usingeri (Linsley, 1935)

References

Hemilophini